Volleyball  at the 2022 European Youth Summer Olympic Festival will be held at the Volleyball Hall Slovenská Ľupča in Slovenská Ľupča, Slovakia and Volleyball Hall Zvolen in Zvolen, Slovakia from 25 to 30 July 2022.

Medalists

Participating nations
A total of 192 athletes from 11 nations competed in volleyball at the 2022 European Youth Summer Olympic Festival:

 (12)
 (24)
 (12)
 (12)
 (24)
 (24)
 (12)
 (12)
 (12)
 (24)
 (24)

References

European Youth Summer Olympic Festival
2022 European Youth Summer Olympic Festival
International volleyball competitions hosted by Slovakia
2022